John Leech may refer to:
 John Leech (jurist) (fl. 1330s), English medieval professor of canon law
 John Leech (caricaturist) (1817–1864), English caricaturist and illustrator
 John Henry Leech (1862–1900), British entomologist
 John Leech (mathematician) (1926–1992), British mathematician, discoverer of the Leech Lattice
 John Leech (DJ) (fl. 1980s–present), English radio presenter
 John Leech (politician) (born 1971), British Liberal Democrat Councillor in Manchester and former Member of Parliament

See also
John Leach (disambiguation)